Tadeusz Adamski (19 July 1922 – 28 July 2001) was a Polish field hockey player. He competed in the 1952 Summer Olympics.

References

External links
 

1922 births
2001 deaths
Field hockey players at the 1952 Summer Olympics
Polish male field hockey players
Olympic field hockey players of Poland
Sportspeople from Poznań